"Faceless" is a song by American Christian rock band Red. It was released as the first single from their third studio album Until We Have Faces. The song was also used in the compilation album WOW Hits 2012.

Background and meaning 
Armstrong expanded on the song to NewReleaseTuesday: "It's basically the keystone of the whole record, the embodiment of what the whole record will be about finding identity. I think that this song is more about realization; you wake up one day and you find yourself be something that you never wanted to be. You find that the world has kind of gotten itself in your head and turned you into something that you were never really meant to be. This song is kind of about a person screaming out with that realization, I'm hollow and faceless. I need to do something about this."

Track listing

Charts

Awards
The song was nominated for "Rock/Contemporary Recorded Song of the Year".

References

2010 songs
Red (American band) songs
Essential Records (Christian) singles
Songs written by Jasen Rauch
Songs written by Jason McArthur
Songs written by Rob Graves